Omloop van de Vlaamse Scheldeboorden is a single-day road bicycle race held annually in September in the municipality of Kruibeke, Belgium. Since 2005, the race is organized as a 1.1 event on the UCI Europe Tour.

Winners

External links
 Official Website 

UCI Europe Tour races
Recurring sporting events established in 1969
1969 establishments in Belgium
Cycle races in Belgium
Sport in East Flanders
Kruibeke